Peddintlamma Temple is a Hindu pilgrimage center. It is located on the shores of Kolleru Lake in Kolletikota of Eluru district in Andhra Pradesh. During the 13th century, the temple was constructed by an Eastern Ganga Dynasty Army General under the reign of the Eastern Ganga king Narasingha Deva I.

Legends 
During the 13th century, Kolletikota region was under the reign of the Eastern Ganga monarchs who ruled from the capital at Cuttack in Odisha. One of his forts was located at Kolletikota. His enemy Muhammadin was encamped at Chigurukota on the shores of Kolleru Lake. When war broke out between the Gajapati and Muhammadin. the Odia army general sacrificed his own daughter named Peddintlamma/Perrantalu to appease the gods on his success. Finally Odia forces won the war and the Army General built a temple dedicated to his daughter named Peddintlamma.

surnames

References 

Devi temples in Andhra Pradesh
Hindu temples in Krishna district
13th-century Hindu temples